Ludwig II is a 1922 Austrian silent historical film directed by Otto Kreisler and starring Olaf Fjord, Thea Rosenquist and Eugen Preiß. It is a biopic, based on the life of the 19th-century Bavarian monarch Ludwig II.

Cast
 Olaf Fjord as Ludwig II 
 Thea Rosenquist as Baronesse Tirnau 
 Eugen Preiß as Richard Wagner 
 Franz Scherer as Kaiser Franz Josef I. 
 Gina Puch-Klitsch as Empress Elisabeth of Austria, "Sisi"
 Josef Glücksmann as Bruder Otto 
 Paul Askonas as Luitpold 
 Josef Schreiber as Otto von Bismarck 
 Ferdinand Onno

References

Bibliography
 * Dassanowsky, Robert. Austrian Cinema: A History. McFarland & Company Incorporated Publishing, 2005.

External links

1922 films
1920s biographical drama films
1920s historical drama films
Austrian silent feature films
Austrian biographical drama films
Austrian historical drama films
Films directed by Otto Kreisler
Films set in Bavaria
Films set in the 1860s
Films set in the 1870s
Films set in the 1880s
Films set in castles
Biographical films about German royalty
Biographical films about Austrian royalty
Cultural depictions of Otto von Bismarck
Cultural depictions of Richard Wagner
Cultural depictions of Ludwig II of Bavaria
Cultural depictions of Empress Elisabeth of Austria
Cultural depictions of Franz Joseph I of Austria
Austrian black-and-white films
1922 drama films
Films set in the Kingdom of Bavaria
Silent historical drama films
1920s German-language films